A house slave was a slave who worked, and often lived, in the house of the slave-owner, performing domestic labor. House slaves performed essentially the same duties as all domestic workers throughout history,  such as cooking, cleaning, serving meals, and caring for children; however, their slave status could expose them to more significant abuses, including physical punishments and use as a sexual slave.

In antiquity

In classical antiquity, many civilizations had house slaves.

In Greece

The study of slavery in Ancient Greece remains a complex subject, in part because of the many different levels of servility, from traditional chattel slave through various forms of serfdom, such as Helots, Penestai, and several other classes of a non-citizen.

Athens had various categories of slave, such as:
 House-slaves, living in their master's home and working at home, on the land, or in a shop.
 Freelance slaves, who didn't live with their master but worked in their master's shop or fields and paid him taxes from the money they got from their own properties (insofar as society allowed slaves to own property).
 Public slaves, who worked as police officers, ushers, secretaries, street-sweepers, etc.
 War captives (andrapoda) who served primarily in unskilled tasks at which they could be chained: for example, rowers in commercial ships; or miners.

Houseborn slaves (oikogeneis) often constituted a privileged class. They were, for example, entrusted to take the children to school; they were "pedagogues" in the first sense of the term. Some of them were the offspring of the master of the house, but in most cities, notably Athens, a child inherited the status of its mother.

Sexual reproduction and "breeding"

The Greeks did not breed their slaves during the Classical Era. However, the proportion of house-born slaves seems to have been relatively large in Ptolemaic Egypt and in manumission inscriptions at Delphi. Sometimes, the cause of this was natural; mines, for instance, were exclusively a male domain.

Also known as a writer of Socratic dialogues, Xenophon advised that male and female slaves should be lodged separately, that "nor children born and bred by our domestics without our knowledge and consent—no unimportant matter, since, if the act of rearing children tends to make good servants still more loyally disposed, cohabiting but sharpens ingenuity for mischief in the bad." The explanation is perhaps economic; even a skilled slave was cheap, so it may have been cheaper to purchase a slave than to raise one. Additionally, childbirth placed the enslaved mother's life at risk, and the baby was not guaranteed to survive to adulthood.

In Socratic dialogues and Greek plays

A house slave appears in the Socratic dialogue, Meno, which was written by Plato. At the beginning of the dialogue, the slave's master, Meo, fails to benefit from Socratic teaching and reveals himself to be intellectually savage. Socrates turns to the house-slave, who is a boy ignorant of geometry. The boy acknowledges his ignorance, learns from his mistakes, and finally establishes proof of the desired geometric theorem. This is another example of the slave appearing more clever than his master, a popular theme in Greek literature.

The comedies of Menander show how the Athenians preferred to view a house slave: as an enterprising and unscrupulous rascal, who must use his wits to profit from his master, rescue him from his troubles, or gain him the girl of his dreams. We have most of these plays in translations by Plautus and Terence, suggesting that the Romans liked the same genre.

And the same sort of tale has not yet become extinct, as the popularity of Jeeves and A Funny Thing Happened on the Way to the Forum attest.

In the Americas

House slaves existed in the New World.

Haiti

In Haiti, before leading the Haitian revolution, Toussaint Louverture had been a house slave.

Toussaint is thought to have been born on the plantation of Bréda at Haut de Cap in Saint-Domingue, owned by the Comte de Noé and later managed by Bayon de Libertat. Tradition says that he was a driver and horse trainer on the plantation. His master freed him at age 33 when Toussaint married Suzanne.  He was a fervent Catholic, and a member of high degree of the Masonic Lodge of Saint-Domingue. In 1790 slaves in the Plaine du Flowera rose in rebellion. Different forces coalesced under different leaders. Toussaint served with other leaders and rose in responsibility. On 4 April 1792, the French Legislative Assembly extended full rights of citizenship to free people of color or mulattoes (gens de couleur libres) and free blacks.

United States

In many households, the treatment of slaves varied to the slave's skin color. Darker-skinned slaves worked in the fields, while lighter-skinned house servants had comparatively better clothing, food and housing. Referred to as "house negroes", they had a higher status and standard of living than a field slave or "field negro" who worked outdoors.

As in President Thomas Jefferson's household, the presence of lighter-skinned slaves as household servants was not merely an issue of skin color. Sometimes planters used mixed-race slaves as house servants or favored artisans because they were their children or other relatives. Several of Jefferson's household slaves were possibly children of his father-in-law John Wayles and the enslaved woman Betty Hemings, who Jefferson's wife inherited upon her father's death. In turn, Jefferson had sexual relations with the daughter of Betty and John Wayles Sally Hemings, the half-sister to Thomas Jefferson's wife. The Hemings children grew up to be closely involved in Jefferson's household staff activities. Two sons trained as carpenters. Three of his four surviving mixed-race children with Sally Hemings passed into white society as adults.

The term "house negro" appears in print by 1711. On 21 May of that year, The Boston News-Letter advertised that "A Young House-Negro Wench of 19 Years of Age that speaks English to be Sold." In a 1771 letter, a Maryland slave-owner compared the lives of his slaves to those of "house negroes" and "plantation negroes", refuting an accusation that his slaves were poorly fed by saying they were fed as well as "plantation negroes", though not as well as the "house negroes". In 1807, a report of the African Institution of London described an incident in which an old woman was required to work in the field after she refused to throw salt-water and gunpowder on the wounds of other slaves who had been whipped. According to the report, she had previously enjoyed a favored status as a "house negro".

Margaret Mitchell made use of the term to describe a slave named Pork in her famed 1936 Southern plantation fiction, Gone With the Wind.

African-American activist Malcolm X commented on the cultural connotations and consequences of the term in his 1963 speech "Message to the Grass Roots", wherein he explained that during slavery, there were two types of slaves: "house negroes" who worked in the master's house, and "field negroes" who performed outdoor manual labor. He characterized the house negro as having a better life than the field negro, thus being unwilling to leave the plantation and potentially more likely to support existing power structures that favored whites over blacks. Malcolm X identified with the field negro.

Use in contemporary politics 
House negro has been used in the contemporary era as a pejorative term to compare a contemporary black person to such a slave. The term has been used to demean individuals, in critiques of attitudes within the African-American community, especially against politically right-leaning African-Americans, and as a borrowed term in contemporary social critique.

In New Zealand in 2012, Hone Harawira, a Member of Parliament and leader of the socialist Mana Party, aroused controversy after referring to Maori MPs from the ruling New Zealand National Party as "little house niggers" during a heated debate on electricity privatisation, and Waitangi Tribunal claims.

In June 2017, comedian Bill Maher used the term self-referentially during a live broadcast interview with Ben Sasse, saying, "Work in the fields? Senator, I'm a house nigga [...]. It's a joke!" Maher apologized for the comment.

In April 2018, Wisconsin State Senator Lena Taylor used the term during a dispute with a bank teller. When the teller refused to cash a check for insufficient funds, Taylor called the teller a "house nigger". Both Taylor and the teller are African Americans.

See also
Field slave
Slave breeding in the United States
Slavery in ancient Rome
Slavery in ancient Egypt
Houseboy
Uncle Tom § Epithet, another term used for an overly subservient black person

References
 
Daily life of a plantation slave
House Slaves
Intro to African Studies chapter 9

Slavery by type
 
Slavery in antiquity
Slavery in ancient Greece
Slavery in North America
Slavery in the United States
Anti-African and anti-black slurs
Stereotypes of African Americans
1710s neologisms